Mialet is a commune in the Dordogne department in Nouvelle-Aquitaine in southwestern France.

Geography
The Côle flows southwest through the southern part of the commune.

Population

See also
Communes of the Dordogne department

References

Communes of Dordogne